North East England was a constituency of the European Parliament. It  elected 3 MEPs using the D'Hondt method of party-list proportional representation, until the UK exit from the European Union on 31 January 2020.

Boundaries 
The constituency corresponded to the North East England region of the United Kingdom, comprising the ceremonial counties of Northumberland, Tyne and Wear, County Durham and parts of North Yorkshire.

History 
The constituency was formed as a result of the European Parliamentary Elections Act 1999, replacing a number of single-member constituencies. These were Durham, Northumbria, Tyne and Wear, and parts of Cleveland and Richmond.

Returned members

Election results 

Elected candidates are shown in bold.  Brackets indicate the number of votes per seat won.

2019

2014

2009

2004

1999

References

European Parliament constituencies in England (1999–2020)
European Parliament
Politics of North East England
1999 establishments in England